Un linceul n'a pas de poches (English: No Pockets in a Shroud) is a French film directed by Jean-Pierre Mocky in 1974.

Plot
A journalist, Michel Dolannes, decides to use his newspaper to denounce the corruption of the established system. One day, he discovers a number of scandals before being shot for attacking the mayor of the town.

Technical details
 Director : Jean-Pierre Mocky
 Screenplay : After the novel by Horace McCoy No pockets in a shroud
 Adapted : Jean-Pierre Mocky, Alain Moury
 Script : Alain Moury
 Assistant director : Luc Andrieux, Eric Ferro
 Photographer : Marcel Weiss
 Camera : Paul Rodier, assisted by Christian Dupré
 Sound : Séverin Frankiel, assisted by Bernard Le Du
 Orchestration : Hervé Roy
 Editing : Marie-Louise Barberot, assisted by Michel Saintourens
 Scenery : René Loubet
 Costumes : Sylvie Jouffa - Claude Gilbert, for clothes - and Jocelyn, for shoes
 M. Mézières is dressed by Gudule and Dixieland Boutique, M. Mocky and S. Kristel are dressed by Sarah Shelburne and Delya Boutique, M. Sarcey is dressed by Pierre Balmain
 Make-up : Louis Dor
 Fight co-ordinator: Claude Carliez
 Waterfalls : Michel Norman
 Script-girl : Suzanne Ohanessian
 Runner : Catherine Lapoujade
 Landscape photography : Pierre Raffo
 Production : Balzac Films, S.N Prodis
 Production director : Robert Paillardon
 Distribution : S.N Prodis
 Filmed from 25 March 1974, External: Paris, the Paris region, Rouen
 35mm film, colour
 Length : 125mn
 Genre : Drama
 Premiere: 11/10/1974
 Visa d'exploitation : 42606

Starring
 Jean-Pierre Mocky : Michel Dolannes, journaliste
  : Mira Barnowski
 Jean-Pierre Marielle : Le docteur Carlille
 Jean Carmet : Le commissaire Bude
 Michel Constantin : Culli
 Michel Serrault : Justin Blesh
 Marisa Muxen/Mocky : Liliane Blesh
 Sylvia Kristel : Avril
 Paul Müller : Minecci
 Christian Duvaleix : Jo
 Michel Galabru : Thomas
 Daniel Gélin : Laurence
 Francis Blanche : Nathaël Grissom "F. Blanche décédé avant la post-synchronisation, fut doublé par Roger Carel qui imita sa voix"
 Martine Sarcey : Mme Mardène
 Michael Lonsdale : Raymond
 Pierre Gualdi : Ferdinand Blesh
 Samson Fainsilber : Gonzague
 Robert Berri : Le militant communiste
 Jess Hahn : Walter
 Jacques Duby : Eckmann
 Alain Adair : David
 Guy Denancy : Bernard
 Carl Studer : Raff
 Katia Romanoff : L'infirmière
 Gérard Hoffmann : Un homme de main
 Dominique Zardi : Un homme de main
 Betty Beckers : Mme Carlille
 Liza Braconnier : Mme Culli
 Jean-Claude Rémoleux : Le metteur en scène
 Georges Lucas : L'acteur maquillé
 Rudy Lenoir : Un journaliste
 Agostino Vasco : Doudou
 Percival Russel : Le boxeur
 Jean Cherlian : Un gros bras
 Louis Albanèse : Un gros bras
 Jean Abeillé : L'employé aux tables d'écoutes et l'huissier Raymond
 Luc Andrieux : Le tueur à la mitraillette
 Georges Bouvier : Un typographe
 Pierre Raffo : Un inspecteur
 Jean-Claude Romer : Un lecteur du "Cosmopolite"
 Lisa Livane : Anne-Marie Minecci
 Aline Alba
 Roxane de Montaignac
 Blanche Rayne
 Laurence Vincendon

Reception
It was released in France in 1975 and recorded admissions of 249,022. The music was nominated for a César Award.

References

External links
 IMDb entry

1974 films
Films directed by Jean-Pierre Mocky
1974 drama films
French drama films
Films about journalists
Films based on American novels
1970s French films
1970s French-language films